Chernogorovo may refer to either of these two Bulgarian villages:
 Chernogorovo, Pazardzhik Province
 Chernogorovo, Haskovo Province